Zhanna Mamazhanova (born 26 January 1994) is a Kazakhstani long-distance runner. She competed at the IAAF World Half Marathon Championships in 2018. In May 2021, she ran a personal best in the marathon of 2:26:54, and subsequently qualified for the 2020 Summer Olympics and competed in the Women's marathon event, finishing in 46th place.

International Competitions

References

Living people
1994 births
Kazakhstani female long-distance runners
Kazakhstani female marathon runners
Olympic athletes of Kazakhstan
Athletes (track and field) at the 2020 Summer Olympics
Sportspeople from Semey
21st-century Kazakhstani women